Scotia Bluffs form a 2-mile (3-kilometer) series of gray sandstone cliffs along the north bank of the Eel River near Rio Dell, California.

Geology
River turbulence has created deep pools beneath steep sandstone cliffs on the northeasterly bank. Tributary streams, including Nanning Creek, cut steep, narrow canyons through the cliffs. The southwesterly bank of the river is an alluvial plain extending to the estuary. The community of Rio Dell occupies the bank opposite the cliffs. The cliffs expose abundant remains of ancient clams and sand dollars.

History
Pacific Lumber Company built a railroad across the face of the cliffs between 1883 and 1885 to transport lumber to Eureka, California. This alignment was followed by the Northwestern Pacific Railroad to avoid bridging the lower Eel River. These trestles and benches have been frequently damaged by floods and by massive blocks of sandstone falling from the upper cliffs. Rail service was interrupted in 1907, 1913, 1933, 1938, 1942, 1946, 1955, 1956, 1957, 1964 and 1971. A railroad bridge crew was assigned to work exclusively on the Scotia Bluff trestles from 1916 through 1959. Three trainmen were killed when engine 184 was swept into the river by a 17 January 1953 landslide off the bluffs.

References

External links
 

History of Humboldt County, California
Landforms of Humboldt County, California
Rock formations of California